Chickenhead may refer to:
Chickenhead (play), by Hungarian playwright György Spiró
Chickenhead (sexuality), a slang term for someone who performs fellatio
Chickenhead, the first song on the 2001 rap album Mista Don't Play: Everythangs Workin by Project Pat
Chickenhead, a term used in science fiction novel Do Androids Dream of Electric Sheep by Philip K. Dick, derogatory term used to refer to 'specials', people who have mentally degraded as a result of exposure to fallout on earth.

See also
The Radioactive Chicken Heads, American punk rock band
Mike the Headless Chicken